Natashia Williams-Blach (born August 2, 1978) is an American actress and former Wonderbra campaign model, who is known for appearing in TV shows like The Vampire Diaries and She Spies.

Biography
Natashia Williams began her film and television career at the age of 16, appearing first on Saved by the Bell: The New Class. Shortly after accepting a scholarship to attend the University of California Los Angeles (UCLA), she landed her first movie role in Def Jam's How to Be a Player She began modeling with the Ford Agency, in the ad campaigns of Wondebra, Old Navy, Hanes and Skechers in addition to being featured in many other numerous publications and runway shows for Guess and Diane Von Furstenberg.

While still modeling, Williams appeared in both movies and television shows such as Son of the Beach, Smart Guy, 'Malcolm and Eddie', 'The Parkers' 'Girlfriends and the film Two Can Play That Game.

Williams first starring role on a series occurred on the show So Little Time alongside the Olsen Twins. Shortly after, Williams co-starred in She Spies with Kristen Miller and Natasha Henstridge.  Although purchased for syndication,it lasted two seasons due to declining ratings.

Williams took part in the recording of "Forever in Our Hearts", a  charity single to raise funds for the Boxing Day Tsunami of 2004. She then starred alongside Romeo Miller in the series Romeo! on Nickelodeon, playing Angeline Miller for the last two seasons.

In 2006, she then booked the pilot, Filthy Gorgeous, about the subworld of high-class prostitutes. The pilot was not picked up although the single episode aired on Showtime Networks as a feature film. She also filmed a cameo appearance in the Anna Faris  comedy Smiley Face.

Following guest-star stints on both CSI Miami and CSI New York, she auditioned for season 7 of American Idol, succeeding through to the Top 25 before being eliminated.

Williams then stars in the Paramount Pictures psychological thriller, Circle of Eight and also had a minor recurring role on The Vampire Diaries.

In 2013, Williams also wrote a book based on her life and career,Mind Over Model, An Internal Journey Through The World Of Externals.  The following year she started Gypsy Posh By TOSH, an artisan crafted jewelry line, as both owner and designer.

Filmography

Film/Movie

Television

References

Tsunami benefit song MTV
Donate to Los Angeles Mission Transform a Life
Gypsy Post website
Mind over model internal externals
So little time. Where are they now? MTV
Natashia Williams
She Spies Variety
San Diego Magazine

External links

1978 births
20th-century American actresses
21st-century American actresses
Actresses from Illinois
African-American actresses
African-American female models
African-American models
American film actresses
American television actresses
American Idol participants
Living people
People from Pontiac, Illinois
Female models from Illinois
20th-century African-American women singers
21st-century African-American women
21st-century African-American musicians